Joseph Miedzianowski is a former Chicago police officer who was sentenced to life in prison without the possibility of parole for racketeering and drug conspiracy. He is known as Chicago's "most corrupt cop" for his part in a cocaine sales ring with gang members and other corrupt police officers.

During his 22-year police career he received 59 citations for valor and arrests and was publicly praised for his high number of drug and illegal weapon busts. During this time he was also secretly revealing the identity of undercover police officers to gang members, protecting drug organizations, distributing crack cocaine, and supplying gang members with ammunition.

Miedzianowski's conviction led to the breakup of the department's gang crimes unit.

In 2020 Miedzianowski requested a reduction in his sentence under the First Step Act. This request was denied.

In 2022 brothers Juan and Rosendo Hernandez had their murder convictions thrown out after requesting a retrial, based on claims that Detective Reynaldo Guevara had framed them at the request of Miedzianowski.

In media
The third episode of the British documentary series Untouchable was focused on Miedzianowski.

References

Living people
1950s births
Chicago Police Department officers
American prisoners sentenced to life imprisonment
Police officers convicted of racketeering
American police officers convicted of crimes
American people convicted of drug offenses